The 2010 Open Tarragona Costa Daurada was a professional tennis tournament played on clay courts. It was the fifth edition of the tournament which was part of the 2010 ATP Challenger Tour. It took place in Tarragona, Catalonia, Spain between 4 and 11 October 2010.

ATP entrants

Seeds

 Rankings are as of September 27, 2010.

Other entrants
The following players received wildcards into the singles main draw:
  Tinotenda Chanakira
  Frederico Gil
  Marcel Granollers
  Sergio Gutiérrez-Ferrol

The following players received entry from the qualifying draw:
  Gerard Granollers-Pujol
  Axel Michon
  Marcelo Palacios
  Boy Westerhof
  José Checa-Calvo (Lucky loser replacing Óscar Hernández)
  Jordi Samper-Montaña (Lucky loser replacing Lamine Ouahab)

Champions

Singles

 Marcel Granollers def.  Jaroslav Pospíšil, 1–6, 7–5, 6–0

Doubles

 Guillermo Olaso /  Pere Riba def.  Pablo Andújar /  Gerard Granollers-Pujol, 7–6(1), 4–6, [10–5]

External links
Official website
ITF Search 
ATP official site

 
Open Tarragona Costa Daurada
Open Tarragona Costa Daurada
Tarra